The men's 1500 metre freestyle was a swimming event held as part of the swimming at the 1912 Summer Olympics programme. It was the second appearance of the event, which had been introduced in 1908. At the 1904 and 1906 Olympics a one-mile freestyle contest was held. The competition was held from Saturday July 6, 1912 to Wednesday July 10, 1912.

Nineteen swimmers from eleven nations competed.

Records

These were the standing world and Olympic records (in minutes) prior to the 1912 Summer Olympics.

George Hodgson set a new world record with a 22:23.0 in the qualifying round and improved his own record in the final to 22:00.0.

Results

Quarterfinals

The top two in each heat advanced along with the fastest loser overall.

Quarterfinal 1

Quarterfinal 2

Quarterfinal 3

Quarterfinal 4

Quarterfinal 5

Semifinals

The top two from each heat and the faster of the two third place swimmers advanced.

Semifinal 1

Semifinal 2

Final

References

Notes
 
 

Swimming at the 1912 Summer Olympics
Men's events at the 1912 Summer Olympics